The 2021 Census of India, also the 16th Indian Census, has been postponed till October 2023, at least. In April 2019, a data user conference was held and it was announced that 330,000 enumerators would be enlisted and that they would be encouraged to use their own smart phones, although a paper option will also be available, which the enumerators will then need to submit electronically. It was further announced that house listing will be conducted between April and September 2020, with actual enumeration in February 2021 and a revision round in March. The reference date will be 1 March 2021 in most of the states and 1 October 2020 for Jammu and Kashmir and some areas of Himachal Pradesh and Uttarakhand. On 2 January 2023, Additional Registrar General of India communicated to all the states that the date of freezing of administrative boundaries has been extended till 30 June 2023. The 16th Census can only begin three months after the administrative boundaries have been frozen. The completion of the census in its two phases takes at least 11 months, so the possibility of the completion of this decennial census exercise in 2023 or early 2024 is ruled out, as general elections are due in April 2024.

In September 2019, Union Home Minister Amit Shah had stated that the 2021 national census would be done fully digitally through a mobile phone application. 2021 census  will be carried out in 16 languages. In February 2021, Union Finance Minister Nirmala Sitharaman allocated  for the census in the 2021 Union budget of India. It was delayed to 2022 and then further delayed to 2023 due to the COVID-19 pandemic in India. Following the postponement of deadline of freezing administrative boundaries to 30 June 2023, and owing to the general elections in 2024, the census can now only take place in late 2024.

Information

House-listings
The House-listing schedule contains 31 questions:

Population enumeration 

The Population enumeration.

NPR
National Population Register will be linked to this census with preparations beginning from April 2020. NPR will be conducted along with the first phase of Census between April to September 2020. On 24 December 2019, the Central Government approved  for updating the NPR across India.

Caste Enumeration in Census
The 15th Indian Census taken in 2011, attempted to estimate the population based on Socio-Economic and Caste Status for the first time since 1931. However, as the enumeration was based on recording the respondents' declaration, it led to creation of hundreds of thousands of caste/subcaste categories. For the 16th Indian census, the government is instead considering enumeration based on a list of educationally or socially disadvantaged castes (known as Other Backward Class) reported by each state. However, in February 2020, the Indian government rejected the demand for OBC data as part of the 2021 census.

In September 2018, the then Home Minister, Rajnath Singh, announced that the 2021 census will have Other Backward Class (OBC) data, for the first time since the 1931 census. Despite this announcement, the questionnaire presented in July 2019 did not have a specific OBC category. Several state legislative assemblies passed resolutions for collecting OBC data including the Maharashtra Legislative Assembly Odisha Legislative Assembly and Bihar Legislative Assembly, while the government of Uttar Pradesh, rejected the opposition's demand to pass such a resolution. On 29 February 2020, central government refused to conduct caste census despite demands from states. Despite Centre's rejection, Maharashtra legislators were adamant for caste based census at least in the state. Protest march in support of OBC census was carried out in Jammu and Kashmir. Minister of State Social Justice and Empowerment, Ramdas Athawale also demanded carrying of census counting every single caste in India.

Delays 
The 2021 census is the first census to be ever postponed in India since its beginning in 1872. Before the census, according to the rules, the boundaries of administrative units are to be frozen before conducting a census, this was initially supposed to have happened on 31 December 2019, with the states having to update these changes to the Registrar General of India by 31 January 2020. The house listing phase or the first phase of the census along with the NPR was to be conducted between April 1 2020 and September 30 2020. However following the Covid-19 pandemic the Union government postponed the census house listing phase of the census exercise. Census became entirely postponed to 2022 owing to the pandemic. However the census was never conducted in 2022 either as it was repeatedly delayed, with the deadline to freeze administrative boundaries being extended to 31 December 2020, then to 31 March 2021, then being further extended to 30 June, then to 31 December of the same year until it was extended to 30 June 2022, after which it was extended to 31 December 2022, with the most recent extension being granted till 30 June 2023. The official rationale for all the seven extensions has been the Covid-19 pandemic, however this has been criticized as during 2021-22, twelve countries in Asia were able to conduct their decennial census including the neighbouring Bangladesh and Nepal. 

The delays have also been attributed by analysts to the linking of the census with the NPR exercise which is seen as the first step towards the controversial National Register of Citizens (NRC), the decision to update the NPR and discussions on imposing a nationwide NRC were some of the key issues taken up by the CAA-NRC protests. The demands for a caste census have also been attributed as one of the reasons behind the continuous delays.

The continuous postponement of the census has led to many commentators and newspaper editorials asking for it to conducted without any further delays as the data from census is the only way to gain granular data on the country, as sample surveys can only provide state or countrywide data rather than street or village or block level data, with some of these surveys also relying on census data. The lack of census data is said to be a major handicap for policy-makers as without it they would've to rely on outdated census data for such local level planning. Many key welfare interventions in India such as the Public Distribution System and the NFSA are reliant on census data, and having outdated data could lead to the exclusion of many potential beneficiaries from them. Without data from the census it is also difficult to validate the outcomes of government interventions using key metrics such as literacy, housing, fertility, urbanization, etc. The lack of updated census data also affects the quantum of reservation for SC/ST segments of the population and the delimitation of constituencies for elections.

See also
 Bihar caste-based survey 2023

References

Censuses in India
India